Karmrashen is a village in the Vayk Municipality of the Vayots Dzor Province of Armenia.

History 
The village has khachkars dating back to the 10-13th century. From 1963 the village was used as a construction site for the construction of the Arpa-Sevan tunnel. Upon a hill to the east are the ruins of a small church, and 1.5 km southwest are the ruins of two other churches. One kilometre south of Karmrashen is a carved votive to Saints Peter and Paul (S. Poghos Petros), set up by Prince Elikum Orbelian in the year 1291.

References

External links 
 

Populated places in Vayots Dzor Province